Gaetano Victor Molinari (November 23, 1928July 25, 2018) was an American lawyer and Republican politician from New York city.  He represented Staten Island in the United States House of Representatives for four terms (1981–1989) and then served 12 years as Staten Island borough president (1990–2002).  His daughter, Susan Molinari, also served as a U.S. Representative.

Education and military service
Gaetano Kenneth Molinari, "who changed his middle name as a teenager to Victor" was born on Manhattan's Lower East Side. His father was S. Robert Molinari (1897–1957), "the first Italian immigrant to serve in the New York state Assembly," representing the 2nd District of Richmond County in the New York State Assembly from 1943 to 1944. After changing from a Republican to a Democrat, Molinari's father was not reelected. His mother, Elizabeth Margaret (Majoros), was of Czechoslovakian descent.

Molinari attended private schools growing up and graduated from New Dorp High School in Staten Island in 1945. He attained a Bachelor of Arts degree from Staten Island's Wagner College in 1949 and his law degree from New York Law School in 1951. He served in the United States Marine Corps (attaining the rank of sergeant), from 1951 to 1953 during the Korean War. He was admitted to the New York State Bar following his discharge from the military in 1953 and commenced practice in Staten Island.

Political career

Molinari was a Republican member of the New York State Assembly from 1975 to 1980, sitting in the 181st, 182nd and 183rd New York State Legislatures. He was a delegate to the New York State Republican conventions in 1979 and the Republican National Convention in both 1980 and 1984.

In 1980, he was elected to the House of Representatives, unseating nine-term Democrat John M. Murphy. The district included all of Staten Island and most of Lower Manhattan. In 1982, his district lost its share of Manhattan, and was instead merged with a Brooklyn-based district that was held by four-term Democrat Leo Zeferetti. Molinari defeated Zeferetti won with 57%. He was reelected to the three succeeding Congresses with minimal opposition and served from January 3, 1981, until his resignation December 31, 1989, to become Borough President of Staten Island. He was succeeded in the House by his daughter, Susan, who also served on the New York City Council. He served as Borough President from January 1, 1990, to December 31, 2001.

In 1994, a week before the statewide elections, Molinari announced his view that Karen Burstein, the Democratic nominee for New York Attorney General, was not qualified to serve as attorney general because she was a lesbian. The combination of Molinari's remarks, a strong national Republican showing, and the win of George Pataki in the governor's race, led to Republican Dennis Vacco's narrowly defeating Burstein. The New York Times called his remarks "gutter politics".

In 1995, Molinari ran for Richmond County District Attorney. He lost the race to Democratic incumbent, William L. Murphy.

A Life of Service (book)
Molinaro co-authored his autobiography A Life of Service  with former NYC Police Lt. -Kossman, a "highly decorated cop, who is also a lawyer and a registered nurse." Feerick, after five years of appeals, began to serve her sentence for having illegally searched for a stolen police radio. With a search warrant still pending, she launched a technically legal "random .. door-to-door" search that, in being carried out, went beyond legal bounds. Feerick-Kossman, a mother with husband Joseph Kossman of two sons, the second seven
weeks old, entered Rikers Island jail. Molinari successfully "lobbied Gov. George Pataki to commute her sentence" and she was released a month later. Her law license was returned in 2000.

The book, whose start can be traced to Feerick's pushing, discusses Molinari's success at convincing a then age 44 Rudy Giuliani to run for mayor of NYC, Giuliani's push for Molinari to run for Staten Island's Boro President, and the (2001) closing of Fresh Kills Landfill, "the largest .. in the world."

Personal life
Guy Molinari's daughter Susan succeeded him as a member of Congress. She is married to Bill Paxon, a former United States House Representative from Buffalo.

Death and legacy
After spending his final years in his home in Bay Terrace, Guy Molinari died of pneumonia on July 25, 2018, at the age of 89.

In September 2003, a new Staten Island Ferry boat was built and was christened the Guy V. Molinari; it joined the New York City Department of Transportation fleet in September 2004, a year later.  The boat continues to transport commuters and tourists between Staten Island and Manhattan.

James S. A. Corey's novel Leviathan Wakes and its television adaptation, The Expanse, featured a spaceship named for Molinari.

References

External links

1928 births
2018 deaths
20th-century American politicians
Staten Island borough presidents
Republican Party members of the New York State Assembly
American people of Italian descent
United States Marine Corps personnel of the Korean War
United States Marines
New York Law School alumni
Military personnel from New York City
Wagner College alumni
Republican Party members of the United States House of Representatives from New York (state)
Politicians from Staten Island
New Dorp High School alumni
Politicians from Manhattan
American people of Czechoslovak descent
Deaths from pneumonia in New York City
Members of Congress who became lobbyists